UFC 164: Henderson vs. Pettis 2 was a mixed martial arts event held on August 31, 2013, at the BMO Harris Bradley Center in Milwaukee, Wisconsin.

Background
The main event was expected to be a UFC Lightweight Championship bout between the current champion Benson Henderson and top contender T. J. Grant.  However, Grant was forced out of the bout with an injury and was replaced by Anthony Pettis.  Henderson and Pettis met in 2010 at the final event for World Extreme Cagefighting, WEC 53.  Pettis defeated Henderson via unanimous decision to win the final WEC Lightweight title in a bout that was widely praised by MMA fans and pundits alike as the fight of the year.

Co-featured was a bout between two former UFC Heavyweight Champions, Frank Mir and Josh Barnett.

Ryan Couture was expected to face Quinn Mulhern at this event. However, Mulhern was forced out with a hand injury and was replaced by Al Iaquinta.

Yoel Romero was expected to face Derek Brunson at this event. However, Brunson was forced out with an injury and was replaced by newcomer Brian Houston. Houston ended up also getting injured and Romero was removed from the card.

Results

Bonus awards
The following fighters were awarded $50,000 bonuses.

 Fight of The Night: Pascal Krauss vs. Hyun Gyu Lim
 Knockout of The Night: Chad Mendes
 Submission of the Night: Anthony Pettis

Reported payout
The following is the reported payout to the fighters as reported to the Wisconsin's Department of Safety and Professional Services. It does not include sponsor money or "locker room" bonuses often given by the UFC and also do not include the UFC's traditional "fight night" bonuses.

Anthony Pettis: $54,000 ($27,000 win bonus) def. Benson Henderson: $110,000
Josh Barnett: $160,000 (no win bonus) def. Frank Mir: $200,000
Chad Mendes: $62,000 ($31,000 win bonus) def. Clay Guida: $44,000
Ben Rothwell: $108,000 ($54,000 win bonus) def. Brandon Vera: $70,000
Dustin Poirier: $40,000 ($20,000 win bonus) def. Erik Koch: $15,000
Gleison Tibau: $74,000 ($37,000 win bonus) def. Jamie Varner: $17,000
Tim Elliott: $16,000 ($8,000 win bonus) def. Louis Gaudinot: $8,000
Hyun Gyu Lim: $20,000 ($10,000 win bonus) def. Pascal Krauss: $15,000
Chico Camus: $16,000 ($8,000 win bonus) def. Kyung Ho Kang: $8,000
Soa Palelei: $20,000 ($10,000 win bonus) def. Nikita Krylov: $8,000
Al Iaquinta: $20,000 ($10,000 win bonus) def. Ryan Couture: $15,000
Magnus Cedenblad: $12,000 ($6,000 win bonus) def. Jared Hamman: $14,000

See also
List of UFC events
2013 in UFC

References

Ultimate Fighting Championship events
2013 in mixed martial arts
Mixed martial arts in Wisconsin
Sports in Milwaukee
Sports competitions in Milwaukee
2013 in sports in Wisconsin
Events in Milwaukee